The Savu languages, Hawu and Dhao, are spoken on Savu and Ndao Islands in East Nusa Tenggara, Indonesia.

Classification
Cappell (1975) noted a large amount of non-Austronesian vocabulary and grammatical features in the Central Malayo-Polynesian languages of East Nusa Tenggara and Maluku, notably in Hawu. While he generally spoke of a non-Austronesian substratum, Hawu is so divergent from Austronesian norms that he classified it (and Dhao) as a non-Austronesian language. He says,

However, it is now generally accepted that Savu is no more divergent than the other Central Malayo-Polynesian languages, all of which display a non-Austronesian component that defines Melanesian languages.

Phonology
The Savu languages have the same vowels and stress rules. They share implosive (or perhaps pre-glottalized) consonants with the Bima–Sumba languages and with languages of Flores and Sulawesi further north, such Wolio, and languages of Flores such as Ngad'a have rather similar lengthening of consonants after schwa. Dhao has the larger inventory, but even where the languages have the same consonants, there is often not a one-to-one correspondence. Apart from Hawu , Dhao is more conservative. Non-obvious correlations are: 

Pronouns
Independent personal pronouns are similar. 

Parenthetical forms in Hawu are dialectical.

Footnotes

References
Grimes, Charles E. 2006. "Hawu and Dhao in eastern Indonesia: revisiting their relationship"
Capell, Arthur. 'The "West Papuan Phylum": General, and Timor and Areas Further West', §2.10.1 in Wurm 1977 [1975], New Guinea Area Languages and Language Study, volume 1: Papuan Languages and the New Guinea Linguistic Scene. Canberra.

 
Sumba–Hawu languages